The Miss Ecuador 1996 was held on November 9, 1995. There were 12 candidates for the national title; at the end of the night Radmila Pandzic from Manabí crowned to Mónica Chalá from Pichincha as Miss Ecuador 1996. The Miss Ecuador competed at Miss Universe 1996.

Results

Placements

Special awards

Contestants

Casting
A casting was held in 1996 to select an Ecuadorian representative to compete at Miss World 1996.

Notes

Returns
Last compete in:

1982
 Napo
1986
 Chimborazo
1989
 Cotopaxi

Withdraws

 Esmeraldas
 Los Ríos

External links

Miss Ecuador
1995 beauty pageants
Beauty pageants in Ecuador
1995 in Ecuador